Sodden Jackal is the title of the debut EP/single released by doom metal band The Obsessed on 7" vinyl. All three songs from the EP were eventually included on The Obsessed's Incarnate compilation.

Track listing

Personnel 

Scott "Wino" Weinrich - Vocals/Guitar
Mark Laue - Bass
Dave The Slave - Drums

The Obsessed albums
1983 EPs